Galápagos (1985) is the eleventh novel published by American author Kurt Vonnegut. Set in the Galápagos Islands after a global financial disaster, the novel questions the merit of the human brain from an evolutionary perspective. The title is both a reference to the islands on which part of the story plays out, and a tribute to Charles Darwin, on whose theory Vonnegut relies to reach his own conclusions. It was published by Delacorte Press.

Plot summary
Galápagos is the story of a small band of mismatched humans who are shipwrecked on the fictional island of Santa Rosalia in the Galápagos Islands after a global financial crisis cripples the world's economy. Shortly thereafter, a disease renders all humans on Earth infertile, with the exception of the people on Santa Rosalia, making them the last specimens of humankind. Over the next million years, their descendants, the only fertile humans left on the planet, eventually evolve into a furry species resembling sea lions: though possibly still able to walk upright (it is not explicitly mentioned, but it is stated that they occasionally catch land animals), they have a snout with teeth adapted for catching fish, a streamlined skull and flipper-like hands with rudimentary fingers (described as "nubbins").

The story's narrator is a spirit who has been watching over humans for the last million years. This particular ghost is the immortal spirit of Leon Trotsky Trout, son of Vonnegut's recurring character Kilgore Trout. Leon is a Vietnam War veteran who is affected by the massacres in Vietnam. He goes AWOL and settles in Sweden, where he works as a shipbuilder and dies during the construction of the ship, the Bahía de Darwin. This ship is used for the "Nature Cruise of the Century". Planned as a celebrity cruise, it was in limbo due to the economic downturn, and due to a chain of unconnected events the ship ended up allowing humans to reach and survive in the Galápagos. A group of girls from a cannibal tribe living in the Amazon rainforest, called the Kanka-bono girls also end up on the ship, eventually having numerous children with the ship's captain.

The deceased Kilgore Trout makes four appearances in the novel, urging his son to enter the "blue tunnel" that leads to the afterlife. When Leon refuses for the fourth time, Kilgore pledges that he, and the blue tunnel, will not return for one million years, which leaves Leon to observe the slow process of evolution that transforms the humans into aquatic mammals. The process begins when a Japanese woman on the island, the granddaughter of a Hiroshima survivor, gives birth to a fur-covered daughter.

Trout maintains that all the sorrows of humankind were caused by "the only true villain in my story: the oversized human brain". Natural selection eliminates this problem, since the humans best fitted to Santa Rosalia were those who could swim best, which required a streamlined head, which in turn required a smaller brain.

Main characters 
 Leon Trout, dead narrator and son of Kilgore Trout
 Hernando Cruz, first mate of the Bahía de Darwin
 Mary Hepburn, an American widow who teaches at Ilium High School
 the Kanka-bono girls, a group of young girls from a cannibal tribe living in the Amazon rainforest
 Roy Hepburn, Mary's husband who died in 1985 from a brain tumor
 Akiko Hiroguchi, the daughter of Hisako that will be born with fur covering her entire body
 Hisako Hiroguchi, a teacher of ikebana and Zenji's pregnant wife
 Zenji Hiroguchi, a Japanese computer genius who invented the voice translator Gokubi and its successor Mandarax
 Bobby King, publicity man and organizer of the "Nature Cruise of the Century"
 Andrew MacIntosh, an American financier and adventurer of great inherited wealth
 Selena MacIntosh, Andrew's blind daughter, eighteen years old
 Jesús Ortiz, a talented Inca waiter who looks up to wealthy and powerful people
 Adolf von Kleist, captain of Bahía de Darwin who doesn't really know how to steer the ship
 Siegfried von Kleist, brother of Adolf and carrier of Huntington's chorea who temporarily takes care of the reception at hotel El Dorado
 James Wait, a 35-year-old American swindler
 Pvt. Geraldo Delgado, an Ecuadorian soldier

Literary techniques

Form 
The main storyline is told chronologically, but the author frequently mentions the outcome of future events (referring to 1986 as being one million years in the past). The most obvious example of this is the inclusion of an asterisk in front of a character's name if he or she will die before sunset.

Quotations 
The novel contains a large number of quotations from other authors. They are related to the story itself and are functionally inserted through Mandarax, a fictional voice translator that is also able to provide quotations from literature and history. The following authors are quoted (in order of their appearance in the book): Anne Frank, Alfred Tennyson, Rudyard Kipling, John Masefield, William Cullen Bryant, Ambrose Bierce, Lord Byron, Noble Claggett, John Greenleaf Whittier, Benjamin Franklin, John Heywood, Cesare Bonesana Beccaria, Bertolt Brecht, Saint John, Charles Dickens, Isaac Watts, William Shakespeare, Plato, Robert Browning, Jean de La Fontaine, François Rabelais, Patrick R. Chalmers, Michel de Montaigne, Joseph Conrad, George William Curtis, Samuel Butler, T. S. Eliot, A. E. Housman, Oscar Hammerstein II, Edgar Allan Poe, Charles E. Carryl, Samuel Johnson, Thomas Carlyle, Edward Lear, Henry David Thoreau, Sophocles, Robert Frost, and Charles Darwin.

Adaptations 
In 2009, Audible.com produced an audio version of Galapagos, narrated by Jonathan Davis, as part of its Modern Vanguard line of audiobooks.

In 2014, artists Tucker Marder and Christian Scheider adapted "Galapagos" into a live theatrical performance at the new Parrish Art Museum in Watermill, N.Y. Endorsed by the Kurt Vonnegut Estate, the multi-media production featured 26 performers including Bob Balaban; live orchestral underscoring composed and conducted by Forrest Gray featuring Max Feldschuh on vibraphone and Ken Sacks on mbira; animal costumes by Isla Hansen; a three-story scenic design by Shelby Jackson; experimental video projections by James Bayard; and choreography by Matt Davies.

In 2019, Canadian band The PepTides released a ten-song collection titled "Galápagos Vol.1", inspired by the themes and characters in Galápagos.

References

 
 Vonnegut, Kurt. Galápagos.  New York: Dell Publishing, 1999. .

1985 American novels
American post-apocalyptic novels
Evolution in popular culture
Galápagos Islands
Ghost narrator
Human-derived fictional species
Novels by Kurt Vonnegut
Novels set in Ecuador
Novels set on islands
Postmodern novels
Science fantasy novels
Speculative evolution